United Nations Security Council Resolution 168 was adopted on November 3, 1961. After Secretary-General Dag Hammarskjöld was killed in a plane crash, the Security Council met to select his successor. The Council recommended to the General Assembly that Burmese diplomat U Thant be appointed as acting Secretary-General for the remainder of rest of Hammarskjöld's term.

The resolution was adopted unanimously by all members of the Council.

See also
List of United Nations Security Council Resolutions 101 to 200 (1953–1965)

References
Text of the Resolution at undocs.org

External links
 

 0168
 0168
November 1961 events